Vrsi is a settlement and municipality in Croatia in the Zadar County. There are 2053 inhabitants according to the 2011 census. The name translates as "above", "on the top".

The village of Vrsi was first mentioned in written documents in 1387.

Since 2006, Vrsi is classified as municipality.

References

Municipalities of Croatia
Populated places in Zadar County